The Dutch DJs, Hugo Zentveld (a.k.a. DJ Renegade) and Aldwin Oomen, are behind a number of dance production projects, including Angel City, Boombastic, and Nightbreed.

Angel City
Angel City is a dance project by Zentveld and Oomen, led by British recording artist Lara McAllen. The majority of their songs are dance covers. The group were signed to Ministry of Sound record labels Boss Records and Data Records. Their hit "Do You Know (I Go Crazy)" sampled the instrumental track "Children" by Robert Miles, as well as the lyrics from "Do You Know" by Michelle Gayle.  It was their biggest hit, peaking at number eight on the UK Singles Chart. Their hit "Touch Me" sampled the lyrics from Cathy Dennis' hit, "Touch Me (All Night Long)". Their fourth song, "Sunrise", was a cover of a track of the same name by Ashiva, and was a Top 10 hit in the UK and across Europe in February 2005. One of the co-writers of this tune, S. Shawcross also co-wrote "City Lights" (which featured on the Angel City album) and has since become an artist in her own right, performing under the name Sarah Lucie Shaw. McAllen left the group in 2005 to pursue a solo career. However, she re-joined Angel City in late 2006, and featured in the band's 2007 single, "24/7". In July 2010, a promo clip of a new song called "How Do You Sleep" was posted on Dance Nation's website.

Discography

Album
Love Me Right (2005) #44 UK

Singles

References

Musical groups established in 2002
Dutch Eurodance groups
Dutch house music groups